Seppo Taito Pietinen (23 October 1925 Viipuri – 5 June 1990 Helsinki) was a Finnish diplomat and lawyer with title of Master in Law. He was an Ambassador in Dar es Salaam from 1971 to 1973, and in Addis Ababa and Lusaka from 1972 to 1973, then Deputy Head of Department of the Ministry of Foreign Affairs 1973–1976, Ambassador in Vienna from 1976 to 1980 and at the same time the Finnish Permanent UN mission and the Holy See 1977–1980, In Lima, 1980–1983, in Bogota, 1980–1982 Head of the Political Department of the Foreign Ministry 1983– Ambassador to Paris 1986–1988.

References 

Ambassadors of Finland to Tanzania
Ambassadors of Finland to Ethiopia
Ambassadors of Finland to Zambia
Ambassadors of Finland to Peru
Ambassadors of Finland to the Holy See
Ambassadors of Finland to France
Ambassadors of Finland to Colombia
Permanent Representatives of Finland to the Organization for Security and Co-operation in Europe
1925 births
1990 deaths
Diplomats from Vyborg
20th-century Finnish lawyers